Chilo may refer to:
Chilo of Sparta, one of the Seven Sages of Greece
Chilo, Ohio, a village in Clermont County, Ohio
Chilo, Bhutan
Chilo (moth), a genus of crambid moths
André Chilo (1898–1982), French rugby player
Chilo Rachal (born 1986), American football player
Chilo Gutierrez (born 1983), American Gigolo